Pigment Red 178 is an organic compound that is used as a pigment. Structurally, it is a derivative of perylene, although it is produced from perylenetetracarboxylic dianhydride by derivatization with 4-aminoazobenzene.

References 

Perylene dyes
Vat dyes
Imides
Azo compounds